Andrei Borisovich Rudakov (born 19 January 1961) is a Russian professional football official and coach and a former player. 

He played in Switzerland, for FC Fribourg, FC Bulle and FC Siviriez.

Honours
 One of the 11 best players of the URSS: 1984.
 Best young player of the URSS: 1985.
 The USSR Football Federation Cup in 1987.
 Soviet Top League champion: 1987.
 Soviet Top League runner-up: 1985.
 Soviet Top League bronze: 1986, 1988.
 Soviet Cup finalist: 1988, 1989, 1991 (played in the early stages of the 1990/91 tournament for FC Torpedo Moscow).

European club competitions
 UEFA Cup 1985-86 with  FC Spartak Moscow : 1 game.
 UEFA Cup 1986–87 with FC Spartak Moscow: 4 games, 3 goals.
 UEFA Cup 1988–89 with FC Torpedo Moscow: 2 games.
 European Cup Winners' Cup 1989–90 with FC Torpedo Moscow: 4 games.

Post-playing career
He remained in Switzerland after retiring as a player and served as the president of Neuchâtel Xamax for a short period of time in 2011.

On 29 July 2017, he was appointed director of sports by the Russian Premier League club FC Arsenal Tula.

References

External links
 
 Profile by Russian Premier League (in Russian)

1961 births
Living people
Soviet footballers
Soviet expatriate footballers
Russian footballers
Association football forwards
Russian expatriate footballers
Expatriate footballers in Switzerland
Soviet Top League players
FC Shinnik Yaroslavl players
FC Spartak Moscow players
FC Torpedo Moscow players
People from Pereslavl-Zalessky
Russian football managers
Russian expatriate football managers
Expatriate football managers in Switzerland
FC Fribourg players
FC Bulle players
Sportspeople from Yaroslavl Oblast